The 13th Empire Awards ceremony (officially known as the Sony Ericsson Empire Awards), presented by the British film magazine Empire, honored the best films of 2007 and took place on 9 March 2008 at the Grosvenor House Hotel in London, England. During the ceremony, Empire presented Empire Awards in 12 categories as well as three honorary awards. The awards for the Sony Ericsson Soundtrack and the Done In 60 Seconds competition were first introduced this year. The Best Newcomer returned to a single award, having last year been split into "Best Male Newcomer" and "Best Female Newcomer" awards and the honorary Outstanding Contribution to British Cinema was renamed to Outstanding Contribution to British Film. The ceremony was televised in the United Kingdom by ITV2 on March 10. Welsh actor Rob Brydon hosted the show for the first time. The awards were sponsored by Sony Ericsson for the fifth year, having last sponsored the 11th ceremony held in 2006.

Atonement won the most awards with three including Best British Film. Other winners included Control with two awards and 28 Weeks Later, American Gangster, Harry Potter and the Order of the Phoenix, Hot Fuzz, Stardust and The Bourne Ultimatum with one. Ewan McGregor received the Empire Icon Award, Guillermo del Toro received the Empire Inspiration Award, and Shane Meadows received the Outstanding Contribution to British Film award. Nick Jesper from the United Kingdom won the Done In 60 Seconds Award for his 60-second film version of Titanic.

Winners and nominees
Winners are listed first and highlighted in boldface.

Multiple awards
The following two films received multiple awards:

Multiple nominations
The following 12 films received multiple nominations:

Done In 60 Seconds films

References

External links
 
 

Empire Award ceremonies
2007 film awards
2008 in London
2008 in British cinema
March 2008 events in the United Kingdom
2000s in the City of Westminster